Damien is a given name and less frequently a surname.

The name is a variation of Damian which comes from the Greek Damianos. This form originates from the Greek derived from the Greek word δαμάζω (damazō), "(I) conquer, master, overcome, tame", in the form of δαμάω/-ῶ (damaō), a form assumed as the first person of δαμᾷ (damāi)

Given name

A
Damien Abad (born 1980), French politician
Damien Adam (born 1989), French politician
Damien Adkins (born 1981), Australian rules footballer
Damien Alamos (born 1990), French Muay Thai kickboxer
Damien Allen (born 1986), English footballer
Damien Anderson (born 1979), American football player
Damien Angove (born 1970), Australian rules footballer
Damien Arsenault, Canadian politician
Damien Atkins (born 1975), Canadian actor and playwright

B
Damien Balisson (born 1996), Mauritian footballer
Damien Berry (born 1989), American football player
Damien Birkinhead (born 1993), Australian shot putter
Damien Blair (born 1972/1973), American basketball coach
Damien Blanch (born 1983), Irish rugby union footballer
Damien Bodie (born 1985), Australian actor
Damien Boisseau, French voice actor
Damien Bona (1955–2012), American film critic
Damien Bonnard (born 1978), French actor
Damien Borel (born 1993), American football player
Damien Boudjemaa (born 1985), Algerian-French footballer
Damien Bowen (born 1984), Australian shot putter
Damien Bower (born 1980), Australian rugby union footballer
Damien Bridonneau (born 1975), French footballer
Damien Broderick (born 1944), Australian writer
Damien Broothaerts (born 1983), Belgian athlete
Damien Brown (soccer) (born 1975), Australian footballer
Damien Brown (fighter) (born 1984), Australian mixed martial artist
Damien Brunner (born 1986), Swiss ice hockey player
Damien Burke, Irish Gaelic footballer
Damien Burroughs (born 1978), Australian Paralympic athlete
Damien Bush (born 1968), English cricketer
Damien Byrne (born 1954), Irish footballer
Damien Byrne (Gaelic footballer) (born 1978), Irish Gaelic footballer

C
Damien Cahalane (born 1992), Irish hurler and footballer
Damien Cardace (born 1992), French rugby league footballer
Damien Carême (born 1960), French politician
Damien Cely (born 1989), French diver
Damien Chapman (born 1974), Australian rugby union footballer
Damien Chazelle (born 1985), American director and screenwriter
Damien Chouly (born 1985), French rugby union footballer
Damien Christensen (born 1963), Australian rules footballer
Damien Chrysostome (born 1982), Beninese footballer
Damien Cler (born 1987), French rugby sevens player
Damien Comer (born 1994), Irish sportsperson
Damien Comolli (born 1972), French football coach
Damien Cook (born 1991), Australian rugby league player
Damien M. Corsetti, American soldier
Damien Corthésy (born 1988), French cyclist
Damien Couturier (born 1981), French rugby union footballer
Damien Covington (1972–2002), American football player
Damien Cox (born 1961), Canadian journalist

D
Damien Da Silva (born 1988), French footballer
Damien De Bohun, Australian cricket administrator
Damien Degboe, Beninese track athlete
Damien Delaney (born 1981), Irish footballer
Damien Delaney (Gaelic footballer) (born 1973), Irish Gaelic footballer
Damien de Martel (1878–1940), French politician
Damien Demento (born 1958), American professional wrestler
Damien Dempsey (born 1975), Irish singer-songwriter
Damien Denny (born 1966), Northern Irish boxer
Damien Dernoncourt (born 1971), French entrepreneur
Damien Desprat (born 1974), French sailor
Damien de Veuster (1840–1889), Belgian-Hawaiian Catholic priest
Damien Djordjevic (born 1984), French figure skater
Damien Doligez, French programmer
Damien Done, an American post-punk band
Damien Dovy (born 1966), French karateka
Damien Duff (born 1979), Irish footballer
Damien Dufour (born 1981), French footballer
Damien Dussaut (born 1994), French footballer

E
Damien Echols (born 1974), American writer
Damien Egan, British politician
Damien Éloi (born 1969), French table tennis player
Damien English (born 1978), Irish politician
Damien Escobar (born 1986), American violinist

F
Damien Fahey (born 1980), American writer
Damien Fahrenfort (born 1986), South African businessman
Damien Fair, American neuroscientist
Damien Farquet (born 1971), Swiss ski mountaineer
Damien Farrell (born 1984), Antiguan footballer
Damien Faulkner (born 1977), Irish race car driver
Damien Fitzhenry (born 1974), Irish hurler
Damien Fitzpatrick (born 1989), Australian rugby union footballer
Damien Fleming (born 1970), Australian cricketer
Damien Fleury (born 1986), French ice hockey player
Damien Fogarty (born 1985), Irish hurler
Damien Fotiou, Australian actor
Damien Fox (born 1961), Irish sportsperson
Damien Francis (born 1979), Jamaican footballer
Damien Frawley (born 1962), Australian rugby union footballer
Damien Freeleagus, Australian actor
Damien Freeman, Irish Gaelic footballer
Damien Furtado (born 1997), French footballer

G
Damien Garvey, Australian actor
Damien Gaspar (born 1975), Australian rules footballer
Damien Gaudin (born 1986), French cyclist
Damien Germanier (born 1988), Swiss footballer
Damien Gildea (born 1969), Australian mountaineer
Damien Godet (born 1986), French cyclist
Damien Gore (born 1999), Irish Gaelic footballer
Damien Greaves (born 1977), British track athlete
Damien Gregori, Irish musician
Damien Gregorini (born 1979), French footballer
Damien K. A. Griffith, Barbadian politician
Damien Guillon (born 1981), French countertenor

H
Damien Hancock (born 1965), Irish football referee
Damien Hardman (born 1966), Australian surfer
Damien Hardwick (born 1972), Australian rules footballer
Damien Harris (born 1997), American football player
Damien Hayes (born 1982), Irish sportsman
Damien Healy, Irish Gaelic footballer
Damiën Hertog (born 1974), Dutch footballer
Damien Hétu (1926–2010), Canadian politician
Damien Hill, Australian rugby union coach
Damien Hirst (born 1965), British artist
Damien Hobgood (born 1979), American surfer
Damien Hooper (born 1992), Australian boxer
Damien Horne (born 1978), American recording artist
Damien Howson (born 1992), Australian cyclist
Damien Hoyland (born 1994), Scottish rugby union footballer
Damien Hudd (born 1981), Welsh rugby union footballer
Damien Hughes, Anguillan football executive

I
Damien Inglis (born 1995), French basketball player
Damien Irwin (born 1969), Irish hurler

J
Damien Jalet (born 1976), Belgian-French choreographer
Damien Jefferson (born 1997), American basketball player
Damien Johnson (born 1978), Northern Irish footballer
Damien Joly (born 1992), French swimmer
Damien Joyce (born 1980), Irish sportsperson
Damien Jurado (born 1972), American singer-songwriter

K
Damien Kane (born 1960), American professional wrestler
Damien Keeping (born 1972), Australian rules football coach
Damien Kelly (born 1958), Irish-American soccer player
Damien Keown (born 1951), British bioethicist
Damien Keyeux, French film editor
Damien Kiberd, Irish journalist
Damien Kingsbury (born 1955), Australian academic
Damien Knabben (1941–2006), Belgian futsal coach
Damien Kurek (born 1989/1990), Canadian politician

L
Damien Lacey (born 1977), Welsh footballer
Damien Lagrange (born 1987), French rugby union footballer
Damien Lahaye (born 1984), Belgian footballer
Damien Lauretta (born 1992), French actor
Damien Leake (born 1952), American actor
Damien Leith (born 1976), Irish-Australian musician and novelist
Damien Leone, American director
Damien LeRoy, American disc jockey
Damien Le Tallec (born 1990), French-Russian footballer
Damien Letulle (born 1973), French archer
Damien Lewis (disambiguation), multiple people
Damien Lock (born 1978), Australian rules footballer
Damien Lovelock (1954–2019), Australian musician
Damien Luce (born 1978), French pianist

M
Damien MacKenzie (born 1980), Australian cricketer
Damien Magee (born 1945), British auto racing driver
Damien Magnifico (born 1991), American baseball player
Damien Mahavony (born 1985), Malagasy footballer
Damien Mama (born 1995), American football player
Damien Mander (born 1979), Australian activist
Damien Mantach, Australian politician
Damien Marchesseault (1818–1868), American politician
Damien Marcq (born 1988), French footballer
Damien Margat (born 1983), French rower
Damien Marie (born 1994), French footballer
Damien Markman (born 1978), English footballer
Damien Marsh (born 1971), Australian sprinter
Damien Martyn (born 1971), Australian cricketer
Damien McCaul, Gaelic footballer
Damien McCaul (presenter), Irish radio presenter
Damien McCormack (born 1987), Australian rules footballer
Damien McCrory (born 1990), Irish footballer
Damien McCusker (born 1966), Northern Irish Gaelic footballer
Damien McCrystal (born 1961), English editor
Damien McGrane (born 1971), Irish golfer
Damien Mealey (born 1968), Australian cricketer
Damien Megherbi, French producer
Damien Menzo (born 1993), Dutch footballer
Damien Meslot (born 1964), French politician
Damien Miceli (born 1984), Belgian footballer
Damien Miller, Australian diplomat
Damien Molony (born 1984), Irish actor
Damien Monier (born 1982), French cyclist
Damien Moore (born 1980), British politician
Damien Mostyn (born 1978), Australian rugby union footballer
Damien Mouchamps (born 1996), Belgian footballer
Damien Moulin (born 1987), French footballer
Damien Moyal (born 1976), American musician
Damien Mozika (born 1987), French footballer
Damien Mudge (born 1976), Australian squash player
Damien Murray (born 1981), Irish hurler
Damien Murray (footballer) (born 1970), Australian rules footballer

N
Damien Nadarajah (born 1968), Sri Lankan cricketer
Damien Nash (1982–2007), American football player
Damien Nazon (born 1974), French cyclist
Damien Neville (born 1975), Bahamian footballer
Damien Nygaard (born 1945), Australian athlete

O
Damien O'Connor (born 1958), New Zealand politician
Damien O'Donnell (born 1967), Irish director
Damien O'Hagan, Irish Gaelic footballer
Damien O'Kane (born 1978), Irish musician
Damien Oliver (born 1972), Australian jockey
Damien O'Reilly (born 1967), Irish Gaelic footballer

P
Damien Parer (1912–1944), Australian photographer and filmmaker
Damien Pasini (born 1984), French racing driver
Damien Patton (born 1972), American mechanic
Damien Perquis (born 1984), French footballer
Damien Perquis (footballer, born 1986) (born 1986), French footballer
Damien Perrier (born 1989), French golfer
Damien Perrinelle (born 1983), French footballer
Damien Peverill (born 1979), Australian rules footballer
Damien Pichereau (born 1988), French politician
Damien Pignolet (born 1948), Australian chef
Damien Piqueras (born 1991), French rower
Damien Plessis (born 1988), French footballer
Damien Poisblaud (born 1961), French cantor
Damien Pottinger (born 1982), Canadian footballer

Q
Damien Quigley (born 1971), Irish sportsperson
Damien Quinn (disambiguation), multiple people
Damien Quintard (born 1991), French sound engineer

R
Damien Raemy (born 1994), French motorcycle racer
Damien Rafferty ( 2010s), Irish Gaelic footballer
Damien Rascle (born 1980), French footballer
Damien Raux (born 1984), French ice hockey player
Damien Ravu (born 1994), Papua New Guinean cricketer
Damien Reale (born 1981), Irish hurler
Damien Reck (born 1998), Irish hurler
Damien Reid, Scottish rugby league footballer
Damien Renard (born 1980), French orienteer
Damien Riat (born 1997), Swiss ice hockey player
Damien Rice (born 1973), Irish singer-songwriter
Damien Richardson (disambiguation), multiple people
Damien Ricketson (born 1973), Australian composer
Damien Roberts (born 1978), South African tennis player
Damien Robin (born 1989), French footballer
Damien Robinson (born 1973), American football player
Damien Robitaille (born 1981), Canadian musician
Damien Russell (born 1970), American football player
Damien Ryan (born 1978), Australian basketball player
Damien Ryan (footballer) (born 1977), Australian rules footballer

S
Damien Saez (born 1977), French singer-songwriter
Damien Sandras, Belgian software designer
Damien Sargue (born 1981), French singer
Damien M. Schiff (born 1979), American lawyer
Damien Schumann (born 1987), Australian volleyball player
Damien Seguin (born 1979), French sailor
Damien Shaw (born 1984), Irish cyclist
Damien Sin (1965–2011), Singaporean author
Damien Smith (disambiguation), multiple people
Damien Starkey (born 1982), American producer
Damien Sully (born 1974), Australian rules football umpire

T
Damien Thomas (born 1942), British actor
Damien Thomlinson, Australian para-snowboarder
Damien Tibéri (born 1985), French footballer
Damien Tiernan (born 1970), Irish journalist
Damien Timmer (born 1968), British executive producer
Damien Tixier (born 1980), French footballer
Damien Top (born 1963), French musician
Damien Touya (born 1975), French fencer
Damien Touzé (born 1996), French cyclist
Damien Traille (born 1979), French rugby union footballer
Damien Troquenet, French canoeist
Damien Tudehope (born 1953), Australian politician
Damien Tussac (born 1988), German rugby union footballer

V
Damien Valero (born 1965), French visual artist
Damien Varley (born 1983), Irish rugby union footballer

W
Damien Walters (born 1982), British gymnast
Damien Dante Wayans (born 1980), American actor
Damien Wayne (born 1971), American professional wrestler
Damien Webber (born 1968), English footballer
Damien Welch (born 1982), Welsh rugby union footballer
Damien Whitehead (born 1979), English footballer
Damien Wilkins (born 1980), American basketball player
Damien Wilkins (writer) (born 1963), New Zealand novelist
Damien Williams (born 1992), American football player
Damien Wilson (born 1993), American football player
Damien Woody (born 1977), American football player
Damien Wright (born 1975), Australian cricketer

Y
Damien Yzerbyt (1963–2014), Belgian politician

Surname
André Damien (1930–2019), French lawyer and politician

Fictional characters
Damien Karras, protagonist of the novel The Exorcist and its film adaptation of the same title.
Damien Thorn, the main character in the Omen series of horror films and Damien TV series
Damien Trotter, in the sitcom Only Fools and Horses
Damien, from the television episode "Damien" from South Park
Damien, from District 13

See also
 Damian (disambiguation), includes people with the given name Damian
 Father Damien (disambiguation)
 Robert-François Damiens (1715-1757), Frenchman who unsuccessfully attempted the assassination of Louis XV of France
 Saint Damien (disambiguation)
 Damiano (given name)

English masculine given names
French masculine given names
Scottish masculine given names
Welsh masculine given names